The 2020 IIHF Women's World Championship Division I was scheduled to be two international ice hockey tournaments organised by the International Ice Hockey Federation.

The Division I Group A tournament would have been played in Angers, France, from 12 to 18 April 2020, and the Division I Group B tournament in Reykjavík, Iceland, from 28 March to 3 April 2020.

On 2 March 2020, the Division I Group B tournament was cancelled due to the COVID-19 pandemic. Five days later, the Division I Group A tournament was cancelled as well.

Division I Group A

Participants

Match officials
Four referees and seven linesmen are selected for the tournament.

Standings

Results
All times are local (UTC+2).

Division I Group B

Participants

Match officials
Four referees and seven linesmen are selected for the tournament.

Standings

Results
All times are local (UTC+2).

References

External links
Official website of IIHF

2020
Division II
2020 IIHF Women's World Championship Division II
2020 IIHF Women's World Championship Division II
Sports competitions in Katowice
2020 in French sport
2020 in Polish sport
March 2020 sports events in Europe
April 2020 sports events in Europe
IIHF Women's World Championship Division I